Adrian Perry (born 9 May 1941) is a former Australian rules footballer who played for the North Melbourne Football Club in the Victorian Football League (VFL).

Notes

External links 

Living people
1941 births
Australian rules footballers from Victoria (Australia)
North Melbourne Football Club players